Kingswood College (Sinhala: කිංස්වුඩ් විද්‍යාලය Tamil: கிங்ஸ்வுட் கல்லூரி) is a public school which offers primary and secondary education for boys in Sri Lanka. The school was founded by L. E. Blaze on 4 May 1891, with 11 students at a site on Pavilion Street in Kandy. Later, the school was moved to Randles Hill. Since then, the school has grown considerably, having over 3,500 students and 200 faculty members. It is one of the oldest schools in Kandy and is commonly known as KCK.

History

Kingswood College was founded by Louis Edmund Blaze, with eleven students, as a boys' high school. At the time, most schools on the island had been classified as stateaided government schools or missionary schools. Government grants were available until a school showed itself established, with a solid core of teachers and an expanding role, but institutions run by individuals did not qualify for government assistance. The first few years of the school's existence were a struggle for Blaze. Fee income barely covered the cost of running the school, so Blaze handed the struggling institution over to be managed by the Methodist mission. In 1961, the school was taken over by the state. 
 
From the outset, he modelled the school on the English public school system. A house system was introduced to the school in 1922, and the names selected were those of major English public schools; (Eton, Harrow, Winchester and Rugby). He built up the school on the strength of his own reputation. It was he who coined the term Gentlemen of Kingswood to describe the body of students of his school and he who chose a motto for the school in Latin; Fide et Virtute. He then chose the school colours — maroon and dark blue — and he wrote the words of the school song.

The school was the first in Sri Lanka to introduce rugby, the first boys' school to employ a female teacher, the first to introduce the sport of rowing and one of the first to establish a Cadet Corps. The first prize-giving was held in 1895, only four years after the school was founded and became an annual feature. One feature of the Kingswood Prize Giving was the Prologue written by Blaze, a review in verse of the year's events in the country and the world. It was generally recited by the boy who won the annual Oratory Prize. Blaze continued to write the annual Prologue for three decades after his retirement as the Principal in 1923, indeed almost up to the time of his death in his 90th year.

In 1900, Blaze wrote the first comprehensive school textbook on the history of Sri Lanka. It ran to several editions before it was superseded by the works of one of his earliest pupils at Kingswood, G C Mendis, who served for many years as a lecturer (and later reader) in the Department of History at the University of Ceylon.

Blaze held office at Kingswood for 32 years, retiring in 1923. He had seen the school through its formative years and had securely established it. Before his retirement, he planned the removal of the school from the small premises it occupied in Pavilion Street. As the number of students continued to grow, the need for a more spacious and less noisy environment became a matter of increasing urgency. The location selected was in the village of Wel-Ata in Mulgampola, then a quiet and seemingly distant suburb of Kandy.

The new site and the new buildings were made possible by a gift of money from a British industrialist, Sir John Scurrah Randles. The new complex of buildings consisted of classrooms, an administrative building, a large hostel and staff quarters. The school's new location (and railway halt just opposite) were named Randles Hill to honour Kingswood's main benefactor of modern times. The new buildings were opened in 1925 under Blaze's successor, Rev'd E Pearson, who ran the school for four years. He was succeeded by Messrs O L Gibbon (1929–1937) and F A J Utting (1937–1942). They consolidated the work that Blaze had begun and, during their administration, the school continued to develop.

Although Kingswood was a Methodist missionary school, the student body contained Buddhists, Christians, Hindus, Muslims, Burghers, Eurasians and a mix of Ceylonese identity groups such as Malays, Chettis and Moors. A strong trans-national admission was seen in the years leading to Independence. Methodist students did have some advantages when it came to the award of scholarships, but the special scholarships were awarded on merit and were open to all.

The 1940s was a crucial period in the development of the school. Wartime conditions put an end to the practice of sending Englishmen as principals of the school. In 1942, P H Nonis became the first Sinhalese national to head the school, holding the post for 15 years. The school admitted some boys from S. Thomas' College, Mount Lavinia when the latter had to vacate its premises during World War II.

When the free education system was introduced in the late 1940s, the Methodist mission had to decide whether the school should opt-out of it and retain its independence as a feelevying school, or join the national education in which the state would pay the teaching staff and relieve its students of the need to pay fees. Some elite schools on the island opted out, but few missionary schools could afford to forgo the advantage of having the salaries of the staff covered; Kingswood was one of them.

Nonis presided over the transition from an independent school to a school in the national school system. The control of the education department bureaucracy, though, was neither vigorous nor rigid. Thus, the change in status was a subtle one, and the school was able to maintain both its independence and its traditions almost undisturbed. Even now, Kingswood was a small institution (with about 700 students and about 35 teachers) compared to other schools in the hill country.

During this period, the school built up a reputation in sports. The school's reputation for hockey was enhanced during Nonis' period. He was a well-known school cricketer and he built up a good cricket team. If one single individual personified the schools' achievements in sports during this era it would be Frederick A White, younger brother of the famous Duncan White.

After Nonis' retirement, B A Thambipillai became acting principal and held office till the arrival of Kenneth M de Lanerolle (1958–1967). His was a much more difficult task than that of his predecessors, for during 1960—1961 the school became fully statecontrolled. When the state took over the school, the number of students increased, as in other state schools in the country. Although the state-financed the salaries and wages of the teachers and the support staff, it became more difficult to maintain sports and other extracurricular activities and to manage facilities to the same degree. Nor was it as easy as in the past to finance the construction of new buildings. Nevertheless, new buildings were erected thanks to the initiatives of de Lanerolle and his constant search for funds from parents, old boys and well-wishers.

E S Liyanage, who was principal from 1977 to 1984, was the first old boy to become principal of the school. The period of Nihal Herath and R B Rambukwella was also important. Herath introduced changes to the college which brought progress in discipline, the standard of education and sports. He also made preparations for the centenary year that was to come in 1991, before he left to become principal of Dharmaraja College, Kandy.

The post-1961 principals had a more difficult task in the management of the school. They were part of a complex administrative system and were in transferable service; their control of admissions was limited; they had little influence in the choice of teachers for the school. Thus, they faced challenges in maintaining the school as a distinctive entity within the state system and keeping alive the school traditions of the past. 

The solid and elegant old buildings are a legacy of the past and even the playing field has been expanded only to a limited degree. Thus, the physical shape of the school is much the same as in the days of the Methodist mission. Those who led the school during this century would need to preserve as much of the original shape as possible, but would also need to add to the buildings to cope with the increase in the number of students.

Ranjith Chandrasekara (2000–2013) ran the college for almost 13 years and was then promoted as the National Schools Director for Sri Lanka. He serves for the Ministry of Education and as chairman of the Sri Lanka Schools Rugby Foundation (SLSRF). He did the school a great service by arranging for the construction of the swimming pool complex, an auditorium and main hall, and a gymnasium, plus a new playground.

College Anthem 

The college anthem was written by Louis Edmund Blaze with the lyrics from the song of Kingswood School in England adapted to local conditions.

College crest

The college crest was designed by A Bartlam of the technical school with the help of R G Anthonisz. Dr A E A Poulier had the badge drawn in England and arranged for the stamp to be engraved. The shield and the cross stand for fides in their literal and derived meaning; with the sun and the wings representing virtus.

School principals

Notable alumni

Former students of the college are known as Old Kingswoodians

Rivalries 

Kingswood College maintains close ties with their rival school, Dharmaraja College, with whom they play the annual 
Dharmaraja–Kingswood Cricket Encounter, also known as Battle of the Maroons,
which is the second oldest annual cricket match in Sri Lanka and the oldest in Kandy region. While the L E Blaze Trophy annual rugby match is played against Wesley College,  The William Weerasinghe rugby match is played against Dharmaraja College. Playing their Annual Football encounter against Wesley College for the Kenneth De Lannerolle Shield. Kingswood competes with Royal College for Lennie De Silva Memorial Trophy in their annual hockey encounter.

References

External links
kingswood.sch.lk
Kingswood College Union
Louis Edmund Blaze and Kingswood - Part I
Louis Edmund Blaze and Kingswood - Part II
 Kingswood OBA, Australia

1891 establishments in Ceylon
Boys' schools in Sri Lanka
Educational institutions established in 1891
Former Methodist schools in Sri Lanka
Schools in Kandy
|}